Crișul Mic may refer to the following rivers:

 Crișul Mic (Crișul Negru), a tributary of the Crișul Negru in Romania
 Crișul Mic (Barcău), a tributary of the Barcău in Romania and Hungary

See also 
 Criș (disambiguation)
 Crișan (disambiguation)